The J.W. McConnell Building is an academic building on the Sir George Williams campus of Concordia University in Montreal, Quebec. Built in 1992, it is named for John Wilson McConnell, a Canadian businessman and philanthropist whose foundation contributed to the building's erection. It sits between Bishop Street and Mackay Street on De Maisonneuve Boulevard in the Quartier Concordia. It is the home of the R. Howard Webster Library, the Departments of English and History as well as the Leonard and Bina Ellen Art Gallery, the J.A. DeSève Cinema, Birks Student Centre and Welcome Centre.

Architecture
Shortly after its completion, the C$65 million building was criticized as "one of ugliest, most offensive new structures to be erected in Montreal since post-modernist architecture came into its prime." McGill University professor of architecture David Theodore wrote in 2000 that "Concordia's last major project was the 1992 J.W. McConnell building on de Maisonneuve Blvd., which houses the Webster library. Meant to be the heart of the downtown campus, it has been severely criticized; for example, for the clumsy incorporation of the terra cotta facade of the Royal George Apartments on Bishop St.

References

Concordia University buildings and structures
1992 establishments in Quebec
University and college buildings completed in 1992